Felton Fenwick Legere (18 September 1913 – 15 August 1963) was a Progressive Conservative party member of the House of Commons of Canada.

He was born in Stoney Island, Nova Scotia, the son of Aldric Legere and Evangeline Amirault. He was a lobster merchant by career.

He was first elected at the Shelburne—Yarmouth—Clare riding in the 1958 general election and re-elected there in the 1962 election. Legere left federal politics in 1963 after completing his term in the 25th Canadian Parliament.

He died on August 15, 1963 at his home in Pinkney's Point after suffering a heart attack.

References

External links
 

1913 births
1963 deaths
Members of the House of Commons of Canada from Nova Scotia
Progressive Conservative Party of Canada MPs